Royal Charles Cooney (8 November 1896 – 27 August 1962) was a rugby union player who represented Australia.

Cooney, a centre, was born in North Sydney, New South Wales and claimed 1 international rugby cap for Australia.

References

Australian rugby union players
Australia international rugby union players
1896 births
1962 deaths
Rugby union players from Sydney
Rugby union centres